Lobotes is a genus of perciform fishes known as the tripletails native to subtropical and tropical waters in all oceans.  This is the sole genus in the family Lobotidae.

Species
The currently recognized species in this genus are:
 Lobotes pacificus C. H. Gilbert, 1898 (Pacific tripletail)
 Lobotes surinamensis (Bloch, 1790) (Atlantic tripletail)

References

 

 
Taxa named by Georges Cuvier